The Christian Historical Voters' League (in Dutch: Christelijk Historische Kiezersbond, CHK) was a Dutch conservative protestant political party. The CHK is historically linked to the Christian Democratic Appeal which is currently one of the major parties of the Netherlands.

Party history
The CHK was founded in 1897.  It was a continuation of the National Party, which was founded in 1888 but had never gained a seat in parliament.  They were founded as one of several parties that were founded in the 1890s, which all turned again the leadership and ideology of Abraham Kuyper, the leader of the Protestant Anti Revolutionary Party.  Kuyper had initiated a new political course for Protestantism in the Netherlands, which included cooperation with the Catholics, in the coalition, strategical support for extension of suffrage a rejection of theocracy in favour of a specific conception of state neutrality, sphere sovereignty and a strong party organization and party discipline.

The party was led by two reformed ministers Bronsveld and de Visser. In the election of 1897 de Visser was elected to the House of Representatives for the district of Rotterdam, while Bronsveld became chair.  A conflict between Bronsveld and de Visser develops, while de Visser wanted to cooperated with other Christian-Historical parties, such as the Frisian League and Free Anti Revolutionary Party (VAR), while Bronsveld did not.

In 1901 de Visser was elected for one of the Amsterdam districts.  In the same year de Visser succeeded Bronsveld as chair and opened talks with the VAR and in April 1903 the VAR and the CHK merged to form the Christian Historical Party (CHP); in 1908 the CHP would merge with the Frisian League to form the Christian Historical Union. In 1977 the CHU merged with the Anti Revolutionary Party and Catholic People's Party to form the Christian Democratic Appeal.

Name
The term "Christian Historical" was used before 1897 to denote supporters of the main Protestant party, the Anti Revolutionary Party, emphasizing the Protestant nature of the history of the Netherlands.  Furthermore the CHK styled itself a voters' league, a caucus, instead of a conventional political party.

Ideology & issues
The CHK was formed as a result of dissent within the main Protestant party the Anti Revolutionary Party, unlike that party the CHK did not recognize Catholicism as a legitimate religion.  The party was strong anti-papist.

Furthermore the party opposed general suffrage. The party was divided over the issue of religious education, with Bronsveld advocating Protestant-inspired public education and de Visser advocating separate Protestant schools.

Representation
This table show the DHK's results in elections to the House of Representatives and Senate, as well as the party's political leadership: the fractievoorzitter, the chair of the parliamentary party . It also possible that the party leader is member of cabinet, if the CHK was part of the governing coalition, the "highest ranking"  minister is listed.

Electorate
The electorate of the CHK was mainly constituted by adherents of the Dutch Reformed Church from the upper class.

International comparison
As a party for Protestant dissenters of a catholic-Protestant alliance the CHK is a unique phenomenon in international perspective. Its political course, which included support of limited government, rejection of universal suffrage and hostility against Catholicism, is comparable to the course of the British Conservative Party in the late 1800s and to some extent American Party of the United States.

References

Protestant political parties
Defunct political parties in the Netherlands
Confessional parties in the Netherlands
Political parties established in 1897
Political parties disestablished in 1903
Defunct Christian political parties
Conservative parties in the Netherlands